

4-Hydroxyphenylacetone is the para-hydroxy analog of phenylacetone, an inactive metabolite of amphetamine in humans.  When it occurs as a metabolite of amphetamine, it is produced directly from the inactive metabolite phenylacetone.

Notes

Reference notes

References

External links 
 

Ketones
Phenols